Gallium selenide may refer to:

 Gallium(II) selenide
 Gallium(III) selenide

Selenides
Gallium compounds